Godaalo(God Alo) is a town in the eastern Sool region of Somaliland/Somalia.

On 13 December 2015, this town was part of conflict between the DNO ASA oil company and the local residents. Dulbiciid mountain in the environs of Godaalo, contains Somaliland's tallest mountain outside the Karkaar range.

Demographics
the city's main inhabitants are from the Dhulbahante clan, who hail from the Omar Wa'eys sub clan of the Mohamoud Garad tribe.

See also
Administrative divisions of Somaliland
Regions of Somaliland
Districts of Somaliland
Somalia–Somaliland border

References

Godaalo

Populated places in Sool, Somaliland